Cockpit is the flight deck of a fixed-wing aircraft.

Cockpit may also refer to:

Arts and entertainment

Theatres and musical venues
 The Cockpit (Leeds), a musical venue in Leeds, England
 Cockpit Theatre, Drury Lane 1616 to 1665
 Cockpit Theatre, Marylebone, a theatre in London

Other arts and entertainment
 Cockpit (2012 film), a 2012 Swedish film
 Cockpit (2017 film), a 2017 Indian film
 Cockpit (novel), a 1975 novel by Jerzy Kosiński
 The Cockpit (OVA), a 1993 anime based on three manga by artist Leiji Matsumoto
 Cockpit (web series), comedy web-series

Other uses
 Cockpit (sailing), an area below deck near the stern of a naval sailing ship
 Cockpit-in-Court, or the Royal Cockpit, part of the historic Palace of Whitehall and originally used for cockfighting
 Cockpit Country, Jamaica
 Cockpit USA, an apparel designer and manufacturer
 The Cockpit, London, a public house in the City of London, England
 Operation Cockpit, an Allied bombing raid on Japanese port and oil facilities in World War II
 The arena where cockfights take place
 The driver's seat of most open wheel racecars, especially in Formula One and Indy car racing

See also
 The Cockpit (disambiguation)